Stockyard Creek may refer to:
Stockyard Creek, South Australia, a former town north of Hamley Bridge
Foster, Victoria is a town in Gippsland that was known as Stockyard Creek before 1879
Stockyard Creek (New South Wales) is a tributary of the Macleay River
Stockyard Creek (Western Australia)
Stockyard Creek (Victoria) is a tributary of the Howqua River